The International Freedom Festival is a multi-day celebration in late June marking Canada Day on July 1 and the American Independence Day on July 4. Detroit, Michigan, in the United States and Windsor, Ontario, in Canada jointly celebrate the multi-day festival which draws about 3.5 million visitors. The International Freedom Festival began in 1959.

Beginning in 2007, the Festival became two separate events, Windsor Summer Fest, and Detroit River Days.

Summer Fest is a 19-day festival, which takes place along the scenic riverfront in Windsor Ontario. More than 500,000 people attend the event each year.

The Detroit RiverFront Conservancy began the River Days festival in June 2007 to introduce the community and visitors to the transformed Detroit International Riverfront. The festival marked the opening of significant portions of the new Detroit RiverWalk and the festival has continued each year to spotlight this destination in the city of Detroit.

The highlight of both festivals is the fireworks display in celebration of the United States' Independence Day and Canada's Canada Day. It is one of the largest and most spectacular firework displays in North America, lighting up the sky over Windsor and Detroit. This annual spectacle draws more than 1,000,000 to the Windsor and Detroit river fronts (citation needed). It is usually held on the Monday shared by both festivals.

Events
Traditionally, several days of events were planned, ending with one of the world's largest fireworks displays.
The event usually took place the last Wednesday of June, every year. However, in 2010, the day was moved to a Monday. The Windsor side also contains a carnival with additional events and rides.

Sponsors
For most of its existence it was sponsored by Hudson's. Its corporate successor Target took over as sponsor until 2013, when the Ford Motor Company became the primary sponsor, with the event re-branded as the Ford Fireworks presented by Target. The show is broadcast on TV by NBC affiliate WDIV-TV, while WJR airs an audio simulcast of its music. On the Windsor side, there is a midway consisting of carnival rides and concessions during the festival.  The Midway operates as a stand-alone attraction at the end of June and beginning of July. It's also sponsored by Zehrs, providing free transportation for people to get to the fireworks via Transit Windsor. The Ford Fireworks is produced by The Parade Company of Detroit.

See also
Detroit International Riverfront
Detroit–Windsor
Detroit Windsor International Film Festival
Windsor International Film Festival

Notes

References
Detroit Riverdays Festival Webpage
Windsor Summerfest Webpage

Festivals in Windsor, Ontario
Festivals in Detroit
Economy of Detroit
Canada–United States relations
Independence Day (United States) festivals
Tourist attractions in Detroit
Festivals established in 2007
2007 establishments in Michigan